The men's 200 metre individual medley swimming competition at the 2002 Asian Games in Busan was held on 30 September at the Sajik Swimming Pool.

Schedule
All times are Korea Standard Time (UTC+09:00)

Records

Results 
Legend
DNS — Did not start

Heats

Finals

Final B

Final A

References 

2002 Asian Games Report, Pages 193–194
Results

Swimming at the 2002 Asian Games